Eumir Deodato de Almeida (born 22 June 1943) is a Brazilian pianist, composer, arranger and record producer, primarily in jazz but who has been known for his eclectic melding of genres, such as pop, rock, disco, rhythm and blues, classical, Latin and bossa nova.

Deodato has arranged and produced more than 500 records for acts such as Frank Sinatra, Roberta Flack, Björk and Christophe, as well as produced Kool & the Gang's hits "Celebration", "Ladies' Night" and "Too Hot".

Deodato was nominated for three Grammy Awards and won the Grammy Award for Best Pop Instrumental Performance in 1974 for "Also Sprach Zarathustra (2001)." The song peaked at number 2 on the weekly Billboard Hot 100 in March 1973. It reached number 3 in Canada and number 7 on the British charts.

Biography 
Deodato began his musical life on accordion when he was 12 years old, and then piano two years later. He studied orchestration, conducting and arranging. He played bossa nova in bands with Durval Ferreira and Roberto Menescal, then formed his own band with Menescal in 1962. Eumir’s paternal grandfather was a marble craftsman from Custonaci, Sicily.

Career

Recording career 
Deodato often plays the Fender Rhodes electric piano. He became successful as a keyboard player in the 1970s. Since then, he has produced and arranged music on more than 500 albums for artists such as Kool and the Gang, Con Funk Shun, Björk, Christophe and k.d. lang. Guitarist John Tropea and flautist Hubert Laws appeared on his early albums.

Prelude, his first album in the U.S., was released in 1973. This album was crossover music style that attracted a large audience and was produced by Creed Taylor for his label CTI. The album sold 5 million copies and earned Deodato the 1974 Grammy Award for Best Pop Instrumental Performance for the track Also Sprach Zarathustra (2001) as well as a Grammy nomination for Best New Artist.

His second album, Deodato 2, reached number 19 on the Billboard album chart, and the single "Rhapsody in Blue" reached No. 41 on the Billboard Hot 100 in 1973. His interpretation of Pavane pour une infante défunte ("Pavane for a Dead Princess") by Maurice Ravel was used in the 1970s by an Australian television station as background music.

In 1978, he had an orchestral hit with Whistle Bump from the LP titled Love Island. The track promoted the widespread use of whistles in nightclubs at the time. However, his popularity in the discos was solidified when he released the 1979 single Night Cruiser from the album of the same name, which earned him a third Grammy nomination for Best R&B Instrumental Performance. Deodato continued recording through the 1980s. In 1985, he had two hits, "S.O.S., Fire in the Sky" and "Are You for Real", on Billboard magazine'ss top 20 Dance chart.

He recorded Live in Rio in 2007. In 2011, he released the album The Crossing, which he produced with Lino Nicolosi and Pino Nicolosi at Nicolosi Productions, with guest vocalist Al Jarreau. In 2010 he played the rhodes piano in the album Oasis produced and performed by Marita Pauli. In 2018 he arranged and conducted the strings orchestra in the album The First released by Riccardo Dalli Cardillo.

Arranging and producing 
Since the 1960s, Deodato has been in demand as a producer and arranger. He has worked on more than 500 albums, and 15 have reached platinum status as defined by the RIAA.

In the early 1960s, he worked as a freelance arranger for Odeon Records. He wrote arrangements for Wilson Simonal, Marcos Valle, and for his debut album, Inútil Paisagem (1964), which was dedicated to the work of Antônio Carlos Jobim and recorded in Rio when Deodato was 22. Jobim praised him in the album's liner notes. Deodato played piano with guitarists Oscar Castro-Neves and Roberto Menescal. He has been credited for helping to start the career of Milton Nascimento. He was part of a committee tasked with choosing songs for a festival, and Deodato chose three by Nascimento.

He moved to New York City in 1967 to work with guitarist Luiz Bonfá and vocalist Astrud Gilberto. He met record producer Creed Taylor, who hired him to write arrangements for musicians at CTI Records who included Tony Bennett, Frank Sinatra and Paul Desmond. Deodato also worked with Joao Donato (1970), Youg, Holt Unlimited (1973) and Luiz Bonfá (1973). He had other collaborations, including producing Kool and the Gang from the late 1970s to the early 1980s and the first solo album by Kevin Rowland of Dexys Midnight Runners in 1988 as well as arranging Bjork's albums Post, Telegram and Homogenic. For his Love Island, Deodato co-wrote the song "Tahiti Hut" with Maurice White. "Tahiti Hut", with lyrics written for it afterwards, was recorded by the band Switch with guest vocals by Jermaine Jackson.

Deodato wrote scores for the films The Gentle Rain (1966), The Black Pearl (1977), The Onion Field (1979) and Bossa Nova (2000).

Personal life 
His daughter Kennya Deodato (b.1968) is married to actor Stephen Baldwin. His granddaughter Hailey Bieber is married to Canadian singer Justin Bieber.

Discography

Albums

As sideman 
With Luiz Bonfa
 The Bonfa Magic (Milestone, 1993)
 Jacaranda (JSR, 1998)
 Black Orpheus Impressions (Sony, 2000)

With Astrud Gilberto
 Gilberto with Turrentine (CTI, 1971)
 Now (Perception, 1972)

With Antonio Carlos Jobim
 Stone Flower (CTI, 1970)
 Tide (Verve/A&M, 1970)
 Antonio Carlos Jobim's Finest Hour (Verve, 2000)

With Kool & the Gang
 Ladies' Night (De-Lite, 1979)
 Something Special (De-Lite, 1981)
 As One (De-Lite, 1982)

With Ithamara Koorax
 Ithamara Koorax Sings the Luiz Bonfa Songbook (Paddle Wheel, 1996)
 Serenade in Blue (Milestone, 2000)

With Roberto Menescal
 A Nova Bossa Nova (Elenco, 1964)
 The Boy from Ipanema Beach (Kapp, 1965)
 Bossa Nova (Odeon, 1998)
 A Bossa Nova De Roberto Menescal  (Elenco/EmArcy/Universal 2004)

With Milton Nascimento
 Courage (A&M/CTI, 1969)
 Clube Da Esquina (EMI, 1972)

With Brenda K. Starr
 Brenda K. Starr (MCA, 1987)
 By Heart (Epic, 1991)

With Stanley Turrentine
 Salt Song (CTI, 1971)
 The Baddest Turrentine (CTI, 1973)
 The Sugar Man (CTI, 1975)

With Marcos Valle
 Braziliance! (Warner Bros., 1966)
 Samba '68 (Verve, 1968)

With others
 Anthony and the Camp, Suspense (Warner Bros., 1988)
 Charles Aznavour, Toujours (EMI, 2011)
 Camp Lo, Uptown Saturday Night (Profile, 1997)
 Tony Cicco, ...E Mo' Parlamm'e Musica (RCA 1987)
 Billy Cobham, Drum 'n' Voice Vol. 4 (Nicolosi, 2016)
 Dazz Band, Rock the Room (RCA Victor, 1988)
 Milton DeLugg, Accordion My Way-Ole! (RCA Victor, 1967)
 Paul Desmond, Summertime (A&M, 1968)
 Eliane Elias, So Far So Close (Blue Note, 1989)
 Roberta Flack, Killing Me Softly (Atlantic, 1973)
 Aretha Franklin, Let Me in Your Life (Atlantic, 1974)
 Fun Lovin' Criminals, Come Find Yourself (EMI, 1996)
 Fun Lovin' Criminals, The Grave and the Constant EP (Chrysalis, 1996)
 Larry Graham, Fired Up (Warner Bros., 1998)
 Kleeer, Seeekret (Atlantic, 1985)
 Kleiton & Kledir, Dois (Som Livre, 1996)
 Tito Madi, Balanco Zona Sul E Outros Sucessos (Odeon, 1966)
 Chuck Mangione, Disguise (Columbia, 1984)
 Maysa, Maysa (Elenco, 1964)
 Lisa Ono, Pretty World Suite! (Supuesto! 2000)
 Jorge Pescara, Grooves in the Temple (2005)
 Pretty Poison, Catch Me I'm Falling (Virgin, 1988)
 Quarteto em Cy, Quarteto em Cy (Forma, 1964)
 Ranieri, Meditazione (CGD, 1976)
 Dom Um Romao, Lake of Perseverance (Irma, 2001)
 Kevin Rowland, The Wanderer (Mercury, 1988)
 Wanda Sa, Wanda Vagamente (RGE, 1964)
 Steve & Eydie, Steve & Eydie, Bonfa & Brazil (CBS/Sony, 1987)
 Riccardo Dalli Cardillo, The First (DCP, 2018)

Singles

References

External links 

 
 
 

Living people
1942 births
Musicians from Rio de Janeiro (city)
Brazilian people of Italian descent
Brazilian people of Portuguese descent
20th-century Brazilian musicians
20th-century composers
20th-century pianists
21st-century Brazilian musicians
21st-century composers
21st-century pianists
Bossa nova keyboardists
Brazilian composers
Brazilian film score composers
Brazilian jazz keyboardists
Brazilian jazz pianists
Brazilian male musicians
Brazilian music arrangers
Brazilian record producers
Crossover jazz keyboardists
Grammy Award winners
Male film score composers
Male pianists
20th-century male musicians
21st-century male musicians
Male jazz musicians
CTI Records artists
MCA Records artists